The Amelia Island Championships was a women's tennis tournament held in Amelia Island Plantation and later Ponte Vedra Beach, Florida, United States. The Women's Tennis Association event was an International series tournament played on outdoor green clay courts from 1980 to 2010.

History
Formerly the Bausch & Lomb Championships, the tournament lost its title sponsor when Bausch & Lomb did not renew its contract following the 2008 event at Amelia Island Plantation on Amelia Island, Florida. Tournament organizers Octagon hired Axia Public Relations, a public relations firm, to find a new title sponsor. In August 2008, Axia and Octagon announced Fortune 1000 global staffing firm MPS Group (NYSE:MPS) of Jacksonville, Florida as the official tournament title sponsor. Octagon moved the annual event to Sawgrass Country Club in Ponte Vedra Beach as part of the tournament changes to attract more attendees and enjoy upgraded facilities.

On May 21, 2010 tournament officials announced that the event would not be held in 2011. The WTA wanted to reduce the number of spring clay court events and the MPS Group Championships offered the smallest prize money. The WTA offered replacement dates in February and July, but no facility was available in February, and temperatures in July can be unbearable.

One of the most unusual matches in the tournament's history occurred in the first round of the 2002 event. Anne Kremer defeated Jennifer Hopkins 5-7, 6-4, 6-2, with both players serving a combined 29 double faults. An investigation discovered that the court markings had been incorrectly measured, resulting in a smaller service box than normal.

Sponsors
1980–1983: Murjani WTA Championships
1984: Lipton WTA Champions
1984: NutraSweet WTA Championships
1985–1986: Sunkist WITA Championships
1987–2008 : Bausch & Lomb Championships
2009–2010 : The MPS Group Championships

Past finals

Singles

Doubles

See also
List of tennis tournaments

References

External links
Official website

 
Clay court tennis tournaments
Recurring sporting events established in 1980
Recurring sporting events disestablished in 2010
Amelia Island Championships
WTA Tour
1980 establishments in Florida
2010 disestablishments in Florida
Women's tennis tournaments in the United States